Inger Carlsen (7 June 1918 – 5 February 1988) was a Danish swimmer. She competed in the women's 400 metre freestyle at the 1936 Summer Olympics.

References

External links
 

1918 births
1988 deaths
Olympic swimmers of Denmark
Swimmers at the 1936 Summer Olympics
Swimmers from Copenhagen
Danish female freestyle swimmers